Manchester bombing may refer to:
 Manchester Blitz during World War II
 1975 bombing of Lewis's by the Provisional IRA
 1992 Manchester bombing by the Provisional IRA
 1996 Manchester bombing by the Provisional IRA
 Manchester Arena bombing by an Islamic extremist in 2017